Marian Borden Mancini is a Canadian politician, who was elected to the Nova Scotia House of Assembly in a by-election on July 14, 2015. She represented the district of Dartmouth South as a member of the Nova Scotia New Democratic Party.

Prior to her election to the legislature, she worked as a legal aid lawyer. She is married to Peter Mancini, a former federal Member of Parliament.

On November 10, 2016, Mancini announced that she would not re-offer in the next election.

On April 23, 2017, Mancini resigned from the Nova Scotia House of Assembly.

Election record

References

Living people
Nova Scotia New Democratic Party MLAs
Women MLAs in Nova Scotia
21st-century Canadian politicians
21st-century Canadian women politicians
Lawyers in Nova Scotia
Canadian women lawyers
Year of birth missing (living people)